Ankitham or Ankitam (Telugu: అంకితం) is an Indian surname.  They belong to Puragiri Kshatriya/Perika community.

External links
 Eminent Families of Visakhapatnam
 College with History
 Raja A.V. Jugga Row Bahadur Garu, Zamindar of Sher Muhummadapuram

Indian surnames